This list shows places located wholly or partly within the London Borough of Lewisham in southeast London, England. Places in italics are only partly in the borough. Places in bold have their own articles with that title; places not in bold are either redirects to other place articles that encompass them, or have no article at all.

The chart shows the electoral wards, the United Kingdom constituencies, and the postcodes the places are located within. There are three constituencies within the borough; they are Lewisham East (LE), Lewisham Deptford (LD) and Lewisham West and Penge (LWP), which also covers part of the London Borough of Bromley. For places only partly in the borough, the chart shows the wards, constituencies, and postcodes that cover the area of the place within the Lewisham borough only.

The post town for all SE post codes is LONDON and covers almost the whole borough, the small part covered by BR1 has the post town BROMLEY. The dialling code 020 covers the whole borough.

Lists of places in London